Johannes Steuchius (3 January 1676 – 21 June 1742) was Archbishop of Uppsala in the Church of Sweden  from 1730 to his death.

Biography
He was born in Härnösand, the son of  Archbishop Mathias Steuchius (1644–1730) .  His family surname was ennobled in 1719 to Steuch. 
He was enrolled at Uppsala University in 1692  and in 1695 at Lund University. Steuchius  received a doctorate in philosophy at Uppsala in 1700 and in   1701, he took up a position as professor and librarian at Lund University. In 1707 he returned to Uppsala University where he was appointed professor of metaphysics and logic as well as extra ordinary professor of theology.

Steuchius left academic life in 1723, when he was appointed superintendent of the Diocese of  Karlstad
In 1730, he was appointed bishop of the Diocese of Linköping however following the subsequent the death of his father, he was appointed to succeed him as Archbishop of Uppsala.

References

Other sources 
 Nordisk familjebok, article Steuchius  
 Entry of Johannes Steuchius in the Rostock Matrikelportal

1676 births
1742 deaths
People from Härnösand Municipality
Lund University alumni
Academic staff of Lund University
Uppsala University alumni
Academic staff of Uppsala University
Lutheran archbishops of Uppsala
Bishops of Karlstad
18th-century Lutheran archbishops
Age of Liberty people